Tynwald is the legislature of the Isle of Man.

Tynwald may also refer to:
 Tynwałd, a village in Iława County, Warmian-Masurian Voivodeship, northern Poland
 Tynwald Day, the national day of the Isle of Man
 SS Tynwald, several ships
 Tynwald South, a suburb of Harare, Zimbabwe

See also
 Act of Tynwald, a statute passed by Tynwald
 Douglas Tynwald Kelly (1920-2006), Canadian politician
 Tinwald (disambiguation)